Svend Albinus (28 August 1901 - 16 February 1995 in Copenhagen) was a Danish architect. From 1930 - 39 he worked at Kaj Gottlob design studio. Albinus received the Neuhausen Prize in 1927 and the Prize of the City of Frederiksberg in  1943. He was the leader of KABS architect department from 1939 to 1954, head of the SBI building research committee from 1954 to 1956 and was then chief architect of the Ministry of Housing from 1956 - 71.

See also
List of Danish architects

References

1901 births
1995 deaths
Architects from Copenhagen
20th-century Danish architects